"Alors regarde" is a 1989 song recorded by French singer Patrick Bruel. Written by Bruel, it was the third single from his second studio album Alors regarde, on which it appears as the fourth track, and was released in September 1990. It was successful in France, becoming a top three hit and Bruel's one of the most famous songs.

Chart performance
In France, "Alors regarde" debuted at number 37 on the chart edition of 29 September 1990, reached the top ten three weeks later, peaked at number three in its 11th week, and totalled 12 weeks in the top ten and 19 weeks in the top 50. On the European Hot 100, it started at number 73 on 20 October 1990, reached a peak of number 20 in its sixth week and totaled 15 weeks on the chart. Regularly played on radio, it debuted on the European Airplay Top 50 at number 47 on 20 October 1990, reached its hisghest position, number 17, four weeks later, and fell off the chart after 13 weeks of presence.

Track listings
 CD maxi
 "Alors regarde" (new mix) — 3:50
 "Alors regarde" (instrumental) — 3:50	
 "Elle m'regardait comme ça" — 3:49

 12" maxi - France, Germany
 "Alors regarde" (new mix) — 3:50
 "Alors regarde" (instrumental) — 3:50	
 "Rock, haine, rôles" — 6:03

 7" single
 "Alors regarde" (new mix) — 3:50
 "Rock, haine, rôles" — 6:30

 CD single - Promo - Poland
 "Alors regarde" — 4:16

Charts

Release history

References

1989 songs
1990 singles
Patrick Bruel songs
Songs written by Patrick Bruel